Woman with a Past is an American daytime soap opera that aired on CBS from February 1, 1954, to July 2, 1954.

The sustaining program originated at WCBS-TV and replaced Action in the Afternoon in the CBS schedule.

Synopsis
The soap focuses on Lynn Sherwood (Constance Ford), a Manhattan dress designer and her tribulations. A couple of months into the show, Lynn opened a dress shop, and the series included fashion shows.

Cast
 Constance Ford as Lynn Sherwood
 Barbara Myers as Diane Sherwood
 Gene Lyons as Steve Rockwell
 Geraldine Brooks as Sylvia Rockwell
 Jean Stapleton as Gwen
Ann Hegira as Pegs

References

External links

CBS network soap operas
CBS original programming
American television soap operas
English-language television shows
Television shows set in New York City
1954 American television series debuts
1954 American television series endings
Black-and-white American television shows